Habana del Este (Spanish for "East Havana"), also spelled La Habana del Este, is one of the 15 municipalities or boroughs (municipios in Spanish) forming the city of Havana, Cuba.

Geography

As its name indicates it is on the eastern side of the city, and includes the overspill towns of Camilo Cienfuegos and Alamar as well as the beach towns of Boca Ciega, Tarará, Santa María del Mar and Guanabo.

Beaches
The chain of beaches called the Eastern Beaches extend for  along the north coast of Havana City province. The beaches are (named from West to East): Tarará; El Mégano; Bacuranao (has a bay shape, thick sand and a small Spanish fortress on its western side); Santa María del Mar; Boca Ciega; Guanabo; La Veneciana and Brisas del Mar. The Eastern Beaches are a popular tourist spot with excellent natural conditions, though tourist facilities are scarce and have yet to be expanded.

See also
Havana Tunnel

References

External links

 Details of municipality

Municipalities of Havana